National Tertiary Route 921, or just Route 921 (or ) is a National Road Route of Costa Rica, located in the Guanacaste province.

Description
In Guanacaste province the route covers Nicoya canton (Nicoya district).

References

Highways in Costa Rica